The Hyundai Santa Fe is a sport utility vehicle (SUV) produced by the South Korean manufacturer Hyundai since 2000. It is named after the city of Santa Fe, New Mexico, and was introduced for the 2001 model year as Hyundai's first SUV. The Santa Fe was a milestone in the company's restructuring program of the late 1990s because the SUV was a hit with American buyers. Between 2006 and 2012, the Santa Fe was positioned between the smaller Tucson compact crossover and the larger Veracruz.

The third-generation Santa Fe introduced in 2012 was available in two versions, which are regular (short) and extended long-wheelbase version. The short model was sold as the Santa Fe Sport in North America (three-row seating was not available) and simply Santa Fe in global markets (three-row seating was standard or optional), while the extended long-wheelbase model is called the Santa Fe in the USA, Santa Fe XL in Canada and called the Hyundai Maxcruz in South Korea.

The fourth-generation Santa Fe has been slotted between the Tucson and the Palisade, with the latter being the replacement of the long-wheelbase Santa Fe.



First generation (SM; 2000)

2001

In its first year in production, the Santa Fe was offered with one of two engine and transmission combinations. In North America, a fuel-efficient 2.4 L four-cylinder engine was standard equipment and could be mated with either a 5-speed manual or a 4-speed automatic. A  Delta V6 offered more power than the four-cylinder but was only available with the automatic. Front-wheel drive was standard (with traction control optional with the V6) and 4WD was optional. A 2.0 L Common Rail Turbo Diesel (CRTD) was offered outside the United States.  Australian Santa Fes went on sale in November 2000 with only one engine/transmission choice – a 2.7L V6 mated to a four-speed automatic transmission. 4WD was standard. A cheaper 2.4L four-cylinder joined the range several months later in 2001, but was only available with a manual transmission.

2002
The Santa Fe entered its second year with only one minor change involving the placement of the V6 emblem to a higher location on the tailgate. In February 2002, the center dash vents and buttons were restyled. The clock was relocated to the center dash from its prior location in the overhead map light assembly, which was also restyled. Demand for the Santa Fe continued to be up but owners had several suggested changes for Hyundai.

Mid-2002

At the same time, chrome interior door handles replaced matte gray handles and a chrome shifter gate on automatic equipped models replaced matte silver gate trim. Few models also received a factory alarm confirmation chirp feature when locked twice via remote, but was rarely equipped until the 2003 model began production.

2003
In 2003, Hyundai responded to some of the customer complaints and suggestions such as the fact that the bonnet used a prop and not gas struts, there was no light in the glove compartment, and the car itself did not have enough power.  In 2003, Hyundai introduced the 3.5-liter V6 in addition to the other two gas engines in North America. The bigger engine came with a computer-controlled four-wheel drive system and a 5-speed automatic, based on the standard 4-speed. A Monsoon high-performance sound system came standard on the mid-level GLS model and came with a 6-disc CD changer on the top-tier LX. Rounding out the changes in the 2003 model was the discontinuation of the highly unpopular Pine Green which in some owner circles has gained the nickname 'Yucky Green'. In Australia, the four-cylinder Santa Fe was dropped in 2003, due to slow sales, leaving the 2.7L V6 automatic as the only model.

2004
Hyundai continued to post sales records with the Santa Fe as it rolled into 2004 with very minor changes. The manual climate controls on the base GL and mid-line GLS were revised very slightly. The remote keyless entry confirmation 'chirp' when the 'LOCK' button on the remote was pressed twice became standard.

Mid-2004

Midway through the year the AM/FM antenna was moved from on the glass in the rear driver's side window to a three-inch (76 mm) rubber antenna in the center of the roof just above the tailgate.

2005

The Santa Fe received its final facelift for 2005. Changes were made to the grille, tail lights, rear bumper, interior instrument cluster.  The instrument cluster was redesigned with the speedometer now reading  (earlier models only indicated 130 mph) and a better-designed toll ticket slot in the driver's sun visor. Both sun visors also received extensions so the sun could be blocked out better when coming in from the side.  The base Santa Fe was discontinued that time, making way for the Tucson.

In Australia, all models received body-colored (painted) bumpers from 2005 on. The color 'Sandstone' was discontinued in favor of a slightly different color named 'Mocha Frost'. The GL trim was dropped as was the four-cylinder engine and its respective 5-speed manual transmission. The 2.7 L V6 took over duties as the base engine. A passenger airbag cutoff that prevents the airbag from deploying if the seat is unoccupied (or occupied by a small person) was also added. A 3-point seatbelt was added to the center rear seating position, as well. The calendar function, housed in the overhead console was removed and a compass took its place.

2006
The last year of this Santa Fe saw few changes. Two colors were discontinued for 2006, Merlot and Canyon Red. A rare color, Dark Emerald Green, was introduced mid-year. It did not appear in any sales brochures and could have only been ordered by a dealership. The LX trim level was renamed 'Limited' and got a corresponding tailgate badge, a first for the Santa Fe of any trim level. Another first was the availability of a monochromatic paint scheme, a departure from the contrasting gray cladding previously standard. The monochromatic option was only available on the Limited in black. In total, these options ran $1900, pushing the Santa Fe's total asking price to nearly $30,000.

In Europe, the new Santa Fe model was launched in April as a 2006 model, offering a new 2.2-liter diesel-powered engine and updated 2.7-liter petrol-powered V6.

Hawtai

Part of a joint venture with Hyundai Motors that began in 2002, a Chinese company, Hawtai Motor, manufactured the first-generation Santa Fe. While it did make Hyundai-branded models for sale on the Chinese market, one of the versions it debuted under its own brand name in 2009 was the Santa Fe C9. Utilizing a 1.8-liter turbocharged inline-four engine acquired from Rover, it was intended to be priced at a significant discount to those bearing the Hyundai name.

Hyundai ended its partnership with Hawtai in 2010 and production ended in 2015.

Second generation (CM; 2005)

2007
The new 2006 Santa Fe went on sale in South Korea in late 2005. In the United States, it debuted at the 2006 North American International Auto Show in Detroit. The first production Santa Fe in the United States rolled off Hyundai's Montgomery, Alabama assembly line on 18 April 2006. It shares this assembly line with the current generation Hyundai Sonata. The new generation sheds the old style's quirky design in favor of a more contemporary look.

In the United States, the new generation is offered in GLS, SE, and Limited versions. The new Santa Fe sees the return of a manual transmission, but only when mated with the  V6. The  V6 (a retuned version of the same engine found in the Sonata) is standard on the SE and Limited and comes only with a 5-speed automatic. Both 2WD and AWD models with a 3.3 L have a fuel economy of  city and  highway. The 2.2l diesel engine (not available in the US) with  has mixed cycle of 7.2l and a city cycle of 8.0l. The 4WD is a Borg-Warner Torque Management device, which diverts power to the wheels with best grip according to the amount of slip. If the front wheels spin slightly, 10% of the torque will transfer to the rear axle. If the front wheels start to slip a lot, 50% of the torque will transfer to the rear axle. Body lean in turns, a problem with the previous generation, has been reduced in the new Santa Fe. Both road and wind noise have also been reduced.

Newly standard on the latest iteration of the Santa Fe are all the safety features the previous model lacked or charged as extra. Electronic Stability Control (ESC), side-curtain airbags for all seating rows, a tire pressure monitor, active front head restraints, and anti-lock brakes are all standard. A heated windshield wiper grid located in the front wipers' 'park' position helps to thaw ice buildup on the blades in colder climates. Some features like the tailgate flip glass and the lower body cladding were not integrated into the new model.

The interior has been upgraded as well with blue-lit dashboard controls (unlike the green color used in other Hyundai models), a gated shifter pattern, illuminated cup holders, and higher quality leather on Limited models. The rear seat head restraints caused visibility problems in the previous model due to their size. The new style features 'shingled' head rests that when lowered completely, sit flush with the top of the seat, helping to maximize rear visibility. The middle rear seating position now comes with its own head restraint and a three-point seat belt built in. LATCH child seat anchors are also standard, and an optional 50/50 third row seat allows Santa Fe to seat seven passengers.

Pricing remained competitive despite the upward move in size and feature content.

In Malaysia, Hyundai Santa Fe is available as a Complete knock down model rebadged as Inokom Santa Fe. The Inokom Santa Fe is only available in CRDi 2.2-liter I4 Diesel and 2.7-liter V6.

The second-generation Hyundai Santa Fe was awarded 2008 Consumer Reports "top pick" and was among the top 10 vehicles for 2008 unveiled in the magazine's issue. The magazine's annual ratings, based on road tests and predicted safety and reliability, are considered highly influential among consumers.

2008
For 2008, only minor changes were applied to the Santa Fe. A navigation system made by LG was offered and the Infinity sound system and the power glass sunroof were made standard on Limited models. The non-metallic white paint trim was dropped, leaving the pearl white as the only white color available on the Santa Fe.

2009

2009 saw only minor changes for the Santa Fe. New mirror indicators were introduced, except on US-built models. The 16" wheels on the base GLS model (USA specification) were dropped and replaced with black steel wheels and plastic covers. Additionally, the GLS received black plastic mirrors as opposed to the body-colored mirrors of the higher-tier SE and Limited models. This cut in equipment was rumored to be a countermeasure to offset the price increase of offering an iPod plug-in for the stereo system. Because of the black mirrors and wheel covers, the additional cost of the iPod adapter was negated, leaving the base price of the vehicle unchanged.

The Santa Fe topped the “20 least expensive 2009 vehicles to insure” list by Insure.com. According to research, the Santa Fe is the least expensive vehicle to insure. Low rates tend to reflect a vehicle's safety.

December 2009 a more economical ‘R’ series piezo electric injector-equipped 2.2-litre turbo-diesel four-cylinder producing 145 kW of power (up 27 per cent) at 3800rpm and 436Nm of torque at 1800rpm (421Nm for the manual).

2010

A mid-cycle refresh designed in Germany for the Santa Fe was implemented for the 2010 model year. The grille now includes horizontal and vertical gridded bars as opposed to the horizontal two-bar grille on previous models, and grilles are now body-colored instead of black. New rear tail lights include all-red tail light covers with extensive chrome outlay, and new 5 split-spoke alloy wheels have replaced the previous 5- and 6-spoke wheels. All Santa Fe's now include standard Bluetooth hands-free phone connectivity and steering wheel audio controls, new darker wood trim, and metallic steering wheel inlay. Gauges have been designed with a new lettering and numbering typeface and backlight design. A new touch-screen navigation system with rear back-up camera was now available. Finally, for the US market, the optional third row seat has been discontinued, leaving the larger Veracruz the only currently sold Hyundai in the United States to seat more than five persons.

Powertrain changes included a choice of the standard six-speed manual transmission or the optional six-speed automatic transmission. Engine choices include a 2.4-litre four-cylinder and a 3.5-litre V6 engine. The latter engine is also used in the Kia Sorento. Both engines generate greater power while obtaining greater fuel economy than previous engine models. Sales began in early January 2010.

2011
Only minor changes were applied to the Santa Fe for 2011. The 1050-watt Infinity sound system became standard on Limited trim whereas it had only been previously bundled with the optional navigation system. Five new colors were added, as well, including Moonstone Silver, Frost White Pearl, Sonoran Red, Mineral Gray, and Espresso Brown.

On 1 September 2010, North American production of the Santa Fe shifted to Kia's new West Point, Georgia assembly plant for the 2011 model year. This was done to free up production capacity at the Alabama plant for the new Sonata and new Elantra.  The Santa Fe fills the void left for a Kia-built Hyundai sold in the United States & Canada after Hyundai ended production of the Entourage minivan in 2009.  Kia, however, is 49.2% owned by Hyundai.

2012
The Santa Fe only received minor changes for 2012: The all-body colored grille (in North American markets) was straightened and received chrome accents while the textured strip below the headlights was changed from amber to clear. The interior received a new shift knob and downhill brake assist was added. The 2012 model will be discontinued by the end of the year, successfully ending production for the second generation.

Santa Fe Blue Hybrid
There is a Hyundai Santa Fe Blue Hybrid that is powered by petrol engine coupled to a  electric motor. The Santa Fe blue Hybrid uses a 270 V lithium polymer battery.

Recall
Hyundai is recalling almost 200,000 Santa Fe SUVs from 2007–2009 model years, because the front passenger airbags may not deploy in a crash due to a possible problem with the occupant classification system. The system gauges the size of a passenger and based on that whether an air bag should be deployed. A software update rectifies the issue.

Safety award
The Second-generation Santa Fe earned "Top Safety Pick" award by the Insurance Institute for Highway Safety. It also received maximum 5 star safety ratings by the National Highway Traffic Safety Administration (NHTSA). The Hyundai Santa Fe earned maximum five star safety rating from Australasian New Car Assessment Program (ANCAP).

The Second-generation Hyundai Santa Fe topped the “20 least expensive 2009 vehicles to insure” list by Insure.com.

Marketing
Advertising Standards Bureau of Australia banned a Santa Fe TV commercial titled 'Restless' or 'Toddler' in 2007, which ASB argued that it promotes an illegal driving activity: an underaged person (a toddler) driving a car.  He also picked up a hitchhiking toddler girl and both were wearing seatbelts instead of approved child restraints which also breached safety recommendations. The ad was produced by Kim Thorp and Howard Greive from Assignment Group NZ and directed by Tony Williams from Sydney Film Company, with post via Frame Set + Match, Sydney. The ad itself won the 2006 Fair Go Ad Awards in Best Ad Award category, and was also nominated in the top five in the Worst Ad category.

Third generation (DM/NC; 2012)

Hyundai launched a redesign of the Santa Fe on 14 February 2012. Unveiled at the 2012 New York International Auto Show on 4 April, the third generation Santa Fe features two wheelbase variants: shorter 5-seat Sport variant (7-seat is optional in several markets) and the long-wheelbase version (called Santa Fe XL in Canada) with three rows of seats and available seating for six or seven passengers. Both models feature the new "Storm Edge" design prototype, eventually to launch on all other models, and feature refreshed Santa Fe unibody crossover platform, akin to most of today's SUVs.

Short-wheelbase version (DM) 
The short-wheelbase version is marketed as the Santa Fe Sport in North America, and simply Santa Fe in other regions. While the Santa Fe Sport is solely available in two-row in the North America, a third-row seat option is available as standard or optional in most regions outside North America.

The 2013 Santa Fe Sport models arrives with an all four-cylinder engine lineup. The standard engine is a 2.4 L developing , with a  2.0 L turbo four on offer. Front-wheel drive is standard, with all-wheel drive being optional. The Santa Fe Sport has Hyundai's Torque Vectoring Cornering Control feature for upgraded drive performance.

The Korean-spec Santa Fe was launched in Asia since 19 April 2012, in short wheel base form with 7-seater capacity. Available engine types are a 2.0L E-VGT R-Line and 2.2L E-VGT R-Line diesel engines.

North America 
The Santa Fe Sport went on sale in June 2012 as a 2013 model. It is available in one basic trim level, but with two engines, and multiple packages that add many features. Engine choices are either a 2.4-liter petrol GDi engine, or a 2.0-liter turbocharged engine, offered as the 2.4 and 2.0T trim levels respectively.

For the 2017 model, both the LWB Santa Fe and Santa Fe Sport has received a facelift with restyled headlights and taillights. In the domestic Korean market, this facelifted model was named "Santa Fe The Prime".

Powertrain

Long-wheelbase version (NC) 
The long-wheelbase variant was released in South Korea as the Maxcruz on March 7, 2013. The longer Santa Fe receives a unique grille design, optional 19 inch alloy wheels, flush dual exhaust tips, and a body shape that accentuates the crossover's added passenger and cargo room hind-wise from the B-pillar.

In some markets, the long-wheelbase Santa Fe is also marketed as the Grand Santa Fe.

North America 
The long-wheelbase is offered in North America exclusively with a 3.3-litre,  V6 petrol engine, the highest output of any vehicle in its class at the time. The Santa Fe in the U.S. is available in two distinct trim levels: the SE (called the GLS until the 2016 model year), and the Limited.

As the fourth generation Santa Fe was released in 2018 for the 2019 model year in North America, replacing the Santa Fe Sport, the long-wheelbase Santa Fe (previously simply called the Santa Fe) was renamed Santa Fe XL, in the USA (having been named that in Canada from the model's inception). In 2019, the Santa Fe XL was replaced by the Palisade.

Powertrain

Marketing 
As part of the Super Bowl XLVII campaign, 3 TV commercials developed by INNOCEAN USA were premiered during Super Bowl XLVII:
 In "Epic Playdate", a father takes his family on a trip in a long-wheelbase Santa Fe consisting of various increasingly unorthodox activities, which include driving around in mud to getting away from bikers behind them and bowling in a human-sized inflatable hamster ball. The commercial features a cameo appearance by The Flaming Lips.
 In "Team", a young boy recruits his own team to take on a group of children who took his football, with the long-wheelbase Santa Fe being used to gather various members of his team, all of which are shown to do various tasks that would typically require adults (such as wrestling a bear, rescuing a man from a burning building and welding).
 In "Don't Tell", a father and his children in a short-wheelbase Santa Fe perform various activities to somewhat extreme extents, including skiing down a dangerous (black diamond-rated) ski trail and watching a horror film, during all of which the father tells his children, "Don't tell mom". In the last activity, the mother goes parasailing with her son, to whom she says, "Don't tell dad".

Fourth generation (TM; 2018) 

On 21 February 2018, Hyundai introduced the fourth-generation Santa Fe in South Korea, followed by the Geneva Motor Show in March. The fourth-generation Santa Fe is a two-row SUV which succeeds the previous short-wheelbase Santa Fe (marketed in North America as the Santa Fe Sport).

The longer wheelbase generated more legroom for passengers in the second and third row.

Third row seats are optional in several markets, standard in some other markets and not available in regions such as North America. A new one-touch seat folding function is included for easy access to the third row seats, which has a  larger headroom. However, Hyundai said the third-row is best for "occasional use". Hyundai also claimed rearward visibility is improved due to the larger rear quarter glass that is 41 percent larger than the previous generation.

The steering of the Santa Fe has been tuned to be more responsive, and the upgraded suspension is stiffer and angled more vertically for longer travel length. As the result, vehicle stability is enhanced while comfort, NVH and overall quietness is claimed to improve. Road noise is also reduced through the use of more sound deadening materials. A self-load-leveling suspension is optional, which continuously adjusts ride height regardless of vehicle load. The fourth-generation model is also built with extensive application of high-tensile strength steel, more than any other Hyundai vehicle during its introduction with 57 percent, or 15 percent more than the older model.

Facelift 
On 3 June 2020, Hyundai revealed the facelifted Santa Fe for the 2021 model year. The facelifted Santa Fe was stated to be built on a newer N3 platform, allowing hybrid and plug-in hybrid models to be offered. With the new platform, Hyundai claimed an expanded use of high-tensile steels in its body structure, while undercovers for the subframe, engine compartment, and cabin floors results in an improvement of the coefficient of drag from 0.34 to 0.33.

The updated Santa Fe features "T-shaped" LED lights that merge into a newer and wider "cascading grille". The rear has also been revised, with a long reflective strip running across the width of the car. Wider wheel arches have been engineered to accommodate the larger 20-inch wheels.

The vehicle has a redesigned center stack with a shift-by-wire, push-button gear selector as well as a new drive mode selector. It also has a 10.25-inch touchscreen and the driver has a 12.3-inch digital gauge cluster.

Markets

North America 
The fourth-generation Santa Fe was announced for the North American market at the 2018 New York International Auto Show and arrived in North American dealerships starting in mid-2018 as a 2019 model. The fourth-generation model replaced the two-row Santa Fe which was previously marketed as the Santa Fe Sport. The long-wheelbase, three-row, seven-passenger version previously marketed simply as the "Santa Fe" remained on sale for the 2019 model year as the Santa Fe XL. Its replacement, the Palisade, debuted in 2018 as a 2020 model.

Initial trim levels included the SE, SEL, SEL Plus, Limited and Ultimate. A 2.2-litre diesel version of the Santa Fe with three-row seating was intended to be sold the United States for the 2019 model year, but was cancelled before launch.

The refreshed model was released in October 2020 for the 2021 model year. The new entry-level motor is a 2.5-liter Smartstream petrol engine, replacing the 2.4-litre engine, and producing . The 2.0-litre turbocharged petrol engine was replaced by the 2.5-litre Smartstream turbocharged petrol engine which generates . Hybrid and plug-in hybrid engines are also offered for the first time, which uses 1.6-liter turbocharged petrol engine paired with an electric motor and lithium-ion polymer battery. The enhanced blind-spot safety tech became standard on the Limited trim, and the Ultimate trim was removed and replaced by the new "Calligraphy" trim, similar to the Palisade.

Australia 
The fourth-generation Santa Fe was launched in Australia in June 2018. Initial trim levels included the Active, Elite and Highlander with a choice of two engines – a 2.4-litre four-cylinder petrol and 2.2-litre four-cylinder turbodiesel, while the V6 engine option from the previous generation was dropped. The V6 engine option was reintroduced with the 3.5-litre MPi petrol in 2020. The facelifted model was released in December 2020, with base, Active, Elite and Highlander trim levels, while the 2.2-litre diesel engine was updated.

Europe 
The engines are offered with 6- or 8-speed automatic transmissions.

South Korea 
The South Korean market Santa Fe was available with a 2.0-litre turbocharged petrol engine producing , and two diesel engines which are 2.0-litre and 2.2-litre respectively. In December 2021, the model gained an optional 6-seat model with captain seats for the second row.

Vietnam 
The facelifted Santa Fe was introduced in Vietnam on 17 May 2021. It is offered in three trim levels: the entry-level Standard, the mid-grade Special and the top-spec Premium. It uses the Smartstream G 2.5-litre petrol engine paired with 6-speed automatic, and the Smartstream D 2.2-litre diesel engine paired with 8-speed Dual-clutch transmission.

Philippines 
The facelifted Santa Fe was launched in the Philippines on 20 June 2022 and went on sale in dealerships on 17 August 2022. It is only offered in one grade which is the GLS, it is paired with Smartstream D 2.2-litre diesel engine matted to a 8-speed DCT.

China 
The Chinese market fourth-generation Santa Fe was introduced in 2019 (called "Shengda" (胜达) in Chinese), featuring a restyled rear end similar to the eighth-generation Sonata. The Chinese version is  longer than the international version, and featuring a  longer wheelbase.

Powertrain

Sales

References

External links

 
 

2010s cars
All-wheel-drive vehicles
Cars introduced in 2000
Crossover sport utility vehicles
Front-wheel-drive vehicles
Hybrid electric cars
Hydrogen cars
Santa Fe
Mid-size sport utility vehicles
Motor vehicles manufactured in the United States